The Indiana Hoosiers football team represents Indiana University in the East Division of the Big Ten Conference. The Hoosiers compete as part of the National Collegiate Athletic Association (NCAA) Division I Football Bowl Subdivision. The program has had 29 different head coaches since it began play during the 1887 season.

The Hoosiers have played over 1,100 games over 122 seasons. Six different head coaches have led the Hoosiers to postseason bowl games: John Pont, Lee Corso, Bill Mallory, Bill Lynch, Kevin Wilson and Tom Allen. Indiana has a 3-8 record over 11 bowl games in which they have competed. The Hoosiers have been guided to the Big Ten Conference title twice: in 1945 by Bo McMillin and in 1967 by Pont. The 1967 season culminated in the Hoosiers' first and only Rose Bowl appearance, a 14-3 loss to USC.

McMillin spent the most seasons (14) as the Indiana head coach, but Bill Mallory has led the Hoosiers for the most games (149). Mallory took the program to six different bowl games, far more than any other coach in school history. The highest winning percentage by any coach is by Madison G. Gonterman, who led the Hoosiers to a 12-3-1 record (.781) over two seasons in 1896-97. The lowest winning percentage for any coach in the modern era is by Bob Hicks, who went 1-8 (.111) in 1957, his only season at the helm.

In 2007, head coach Terry Hoeppner died of brain cancer.  Offensive coordinator Bill Lynch took over as head coach and led the 2007 Hoosiers to a 7-6 season, which included a last-second win over rival Purdue in the Bucket Game and a trip to the Insight Bowl. The bowl berth was the first for the Hoosiers in 14 years.

Kevin Wilson would take over the Hoosiers football program in December 2011. With an overall record of 26-47, Wilson would bring the Hoosiers to their first bowl game since 2007, at the 2015 Pinstripe Bowl. This would be Wilson's only bowl game, as Wilson resigned on December 1, 2016, amidst "philosophical differences" with Athletic Director Fred Glass and allegations of player mistreatment.

The head coach of the Hoosiers is Tom Allen. Indiana is the first head coaching job for Allen, who was promoted from Defensive Coordinator to Head Coach in December 2016. Allen has previously held assistant and coordinator positions at South Florida, Ole Miss, Arkansas State, Drake, Lambuth and Wabash. Following the departure of Wilson in December 2016, Allen's first game as head coach of the Hoosiers was on December 28, 2016 in the Foster Farms Bowl. The Hoosiers would lose to Utah by a score of 26-24.

Coaches

References

Lists of college football head coaches
 
Indiana sports-related lists